Joseph Barker may refer to:

Joseph Barker (Massachusetts politician) (1751–1815), American Congregationalist minister and U.S. Representative from Massachusetts
Joseph Barker (mayor) (1806–1862), American mayor of Pittsburgh remembered for his nativist and anti-Catholic activism
Joseph Barker (minister) (1806–1875), English preacher, author, and controversialist
Joseph Barker (priest) (1834–1924), Anglican priest in South Africa
Joseph Scott Barker (born 1963), American Episcopal clergyman
Joseph Warren Barker (1891–1975), American electrical and mechanical engineer

See also
Joe Baker (1940–2003), England international footballer
Colonel Joseph Barker House, an historic residence in Washington County, Ohio
Barker (surname)